Stefan Uchikov (born on 22 January 1976) is a Bulgarian former footballer who last played as a midfielder for Levski Karlovo.

Career
During his career Uchikov has played for a number of teams, including Metalik Sopot, Botev Plovdiv, Lokomotiv Sofia and Maritsa Plovdiv.

References

1976 births
Living people
Bulgarian footballers
Botev Plovdiv players
FC Lokomotiv 1929 Sofia players
PFC Rodopa Smolyan players
FC Maritsa Plovdiv players
FC Spartak Plovdiv players
FC Levski Karlovo players
First Professional Football League (Bulgaria) players
Association football midfielders